Dear World is a Broadway musical.

Dear World may also refer to:

 "Dear World", a song by David Gates from the 1994 album Love Is Always Seventeen
 "Dear World", a song by Echosmith from the 2017 album Inside a Dream
 "Dear World", a song by Nine Inch Nails from the 2016 EP Not the Actual Events

See also
 Dear (disambiguation)
 World (disambiguation)